This is a list of diplomatic missions in Kenya. There are currently 92 embassies/high commissions in Nairobi and three consulates in Mombasa. Honorary consulates are not listed below.

Diplomatic missions in Nairobi

Embassies and High Commissions

Permanent missions to the United Nations Office in Nairobi

Other missions or delegations 
 (Delegation)
 (Representative Office)

Gallery

Consular missions

Nairobi 
 (Consulate-General)

Mombasa 

 (Assistant High Commission)
 (Consulate-General)
 (Consulate-General)

Accredited embassies and high commissions 
Resident in Addis Ababa, Ethiopia

Resident in Pretoria, South Africa

Resident in Dar es Salaam, Tanzania

Resident in other cities

 (Cairo)
 (Nicosia)
 (London)
 (Kampala)
 (Cairo)
 (Valletta)
 (Riyadh)
 (Kampala)
 (Algiers)
 (Singapore)

Embassies to open

See also 
 Foreign relations of Kenya

References

External links 
 Kenyan Ministry of Foreign Affairs
 Diplomatic list

List
Diplomatic missions
Kenya